Rudravathi is a panchayat town in Tirupur district in the Indian state of Tamil Nadu.

Demographics
 2011 Census of India, Rudravathi had a population of 6807, of which 3440 are male and 3367 are female. Rudravathi has an average literacy rate of 69.15%: male literacy is 78.70%, and female literacy is 59.47%. In Rudravathi, 6.8% of the population is under 7 years of age.

References

Villages in Erode district